Urko Berrade Fernández (born 28 November 1997) is a Spanish cyclist, who currently rides for UCI ProTeam .

Major results
2020
 5th Overall Giro della Friuli Venezia Giulia
2021
 5th Overall CRO Race
 5th Overall Tour du Limousin
1st  Young rider classification
2022
 8th Overall O Gran Camiño

Grand Tour general classification results timeline

References

External links

1997 births
Living people
Spanish male cyclists
Sportspeople from Pamplona
Cyclists from Navarre